Nallampalli is a town in Dharmapuri district in Tamil Nadu, India. It is the headquarters of Nallampalli taluk. It is just 10km away from Dharmapuri city. Pincode : 636807

References

Cities and towns in Dharmapuri district